The 1956 U.S. Senate election in North Dakota was held November 6, 1956. The incumbent, Republican Senator Milton Young, sought and received re-election to his third term, defeating North Dakota Democratic-NPL Party candidate Quentin N. Burdick, son of North Dakota congressman Usher L. Burdick.

Only Young filed as a Republican, and the endorsed Democratic candidate was Quentin Burdick, the son of well-known politician Usher Burdick, and former candidate for Governor of North Dakota. Young and Burdick won the primary elections for their respective parties.

One independent candidate, Arthur C. Townley, also filed before the deadline. Townley would later seek the state's other senate seat in 1958 (see election), and was known for creating the National Non-Partisan League.

Election results

Notes

External links
1956 North Dakota U.S. Senate Election results

See also 
 1956 United States Senate elections

1956
North Dakota
1956 North Dakota elections